is a 1967 Japanese drama film directed by Yoshishige Yoshida. It is based on Masaaki Tachihara's novel Shiroi keshi.

Plot
One year after her mother died in an accident, Oriko returns to writing poetry which she had given up when she married her husband Takashi. At a gathering of fellow writers, she meets Mitsuharu, a sculptor and former lover of her late mother. Oriko had despised her mother's changing affairs, although she had been a widow by then, and is herself blamed by her husband for her coldness. Mitsuharu informs her that he wasn't her mother's last lover, but that she had left him for a labourer, with whom she was seen drunk on the day when she was fatally hit by a truck.

One night, Oriko witnesses her husband's sister Yuko having sex with a construction worker in a hut, which she considers rape and reports to the police. Later, she returns to the worker's hut, where he tells her outright that she speculated on sleeping with him as well. He makes a forceful advance, to which Oriko, first reluctant, finally gives in. Oriko meets with Mitsuharu again, confessing that when she was younger, she was not only jealous of him as a daughter, but also as a woman. When she tells him of her encounter with the worker, Mitsuharu is outraged and hurt. Takashi learns of Oriko's meetings with Mitsuharu, but it is not before a confrontation between him, Oriko and Mitsuharu that Oriko and Mitsuharu start an affair.

When Mitsuharu's spine is broken after being buried under one of his stone sculptures, Oriko, still married, vows to stay with him, although it is unclear if he will gain back his ability to walk and his virility. In one of her recurring fantasies about her mother's accident, Oriko now sees herself as the victim and the construction worker at the truck's wheel. Some time later, she sees the worker at a train station, watching unmoved as he enters a train.

Cast
 Mariko Okada as Oriko 
 Isao Kimura as Mitsuharu Noto
 Yoshie Minami as Shigeko, Oriko's mother
 Tadahiko Kanno as Takashi Furuhuta
 Shigako Shimegi as Yuko, Furuhata's sister
 Etsushi Takahashi as construction worker

Reception
In his book A Hundred Years of Japanese Film, film historian Donald Richie saw The Affair as a film of social concern about a woman's fight against her own sensual nature, "formally shot and edited with much economy".

References

External links
 

1967 films
1967 drama films
Japanese drama films
Films based on Japanese novels
Films directed by Yoshishige Yoshida
1960s Japanese-language films
1960s Japanese films